
Samuel Hall Gregory (1814–1892) was an interior decorator and wallpaper manufacturer, importer and retailer in Boston, Massachusetts, in the 19th century. "He was known for being one of the first 'high society' decorators in America." He worked in Boston with a succession of business partners: C. Dudley Brown, James H. Foster, S.M. Hurlbert, Charles W. Robinson, and also with T. Christy and S.S. Constant of New York. In 1852 Gregory served on the board of the newly established Boston YMCA, the first YMCA chapter in the United States. He worked on Court Street (1840s-1870s) and West Street (1880s) in Boston, and lived in Brookline, Massachusetts.

References

Further reading

 "Samuel H. Gregory." In: Scottish Rite. Proceedings of the Supreme Council for the Northern Jurisdiction. Chicago: Printed at the Office of the Freemason's Magazine, 1893; p. 209+

Image gallery

1814 births
1892 deaths
19th century in Boston
Economic history of Boston
Financial District, Boston
Businesspeople from Boston
People from Brookline, Massachusetts
YMCA leaders
19th-century American businesspeople